Case history may refer to:

 Medical history of a patient
 Case Histories, 2004 novel by Kate Atkinson
 Case Histories (TV series), based on the novel
 Case Histories (album) (1989), by Pain Teens
 Case History (album) (1972), by Kevin Coyne